Polícia means police in some languages. Policia may refer to:

Law enforcement

Spanish terms

Policía Federal Argentina (Argentine Federal Police)
Policía Nacional de Colombia (National Police of Colombia)
Policía Nacional del Perú (National Police of Peru)
Cuerpo Nacional de Policía (National Police Corps of Spain)

Portuguese terms

Brazil:
Polícia Civil (Civil Police (Brazil))
Polícia Federal (Federal Police (Brazil))
Polícia Ferroviária (Federal Railroad Police)
Polícia Militar (Military Police (Brazil))
Polícia Rodoviária (Federal Highway Police)
Polícia de Segurança Pública, Portugal
Guarda nacional Republicana, Portugal
Corpo de Polícia de Segurança Pública, Macau

Albanian terms
Policia e Shtetit (Albanian Police)

Music
"Polícia" (song), a song by the Brazilian rock band Titãs